Str8 Killa is the debut EP by rapper Freddie Gibbs. It was released on August 3, 2010 through Decon Records and Gibbs Family.

Singles
 The first single was "National Anthem (Fuck the World)" and it was released on June 29, 2010. It was produced by L.A. Riot Music. A music video was released for the single on July 27, 2010.
 The second single was "Oil Money", featuring Chuck Inglish, Chip tha Ripper, Bun B & Dan Auerbach, and was released on July 20, 2010. A music video was released for the single on September 8, 2010.

Track listing
Track listing confirmed by Rap-Up.

Charts

Credits
Credits confirmed by AllMusic.
Beatnick – Producing, Mixing
Archibald Bonkers – Executive Producer
Cook Classics – Engineer
Deacon the Villain – Synthesizer
DJ Burn One – Producer, Mixing
B. Freeman – Composer
Freddie Gibbs – Executive Producer
K-Salaam – Producer, Mixing
Kno – Synthesizer, Producer, Drum Programming, Mixing
Lambo – Executive Producer
Sidney Miller – Composer
Alex Ortiz – Vocal Mixing
N. Phillips – Composer
Alexander Richter – Photography

References

2010 debut EPs
Freddie Gibbs albums